Jukka Rangell's cabinet was the 25th government of Finland, which reigned during the Second World War for 791 days, from January 4, 1941 to March 5, 1943. It was a majority government which comprised six parties and one independent minister. The composition of the government was based largely on its predecessor, the Ryti II Cabinet.

Ministers

References 

Rangell
1941 establishments in Finland
1943 disestablishments in Finland
Cabinets established in 1941
Cabinets disestablished in 1943